Luigi Ricci-Stolz (185210 February 1906) was an Italian musician and composer.

He was born as Giacomo Ricci in Trieste to composer Luigi Ricci and opera singer Francesca Stolz (1826–1900?), the elder sister of the famous Verdian diva Teresa Stolz. At the time Luigi Ricci was married to Ludmila Stolz (1826–1910), the identical twin sister of Francesca. Ricci-Stolz's uncle, Federico Ricci, was also a composer.

He inherited the estate of his aunt Teresa Stolz, and changed his name to Ricci-Stolz.

Ricci-Stolz was a conductor and composer. In addition to church music, songs and a string quartet, he also published a number of operas.

He died in Milan in 1906, aged 54.

Operas

 Frosina – Genoa, 1870
 Cola di Rienzo – Venice, 1880
 Un curioso accidente – Venice, 1880
 Donna Ines – Piacenza, 1885
 La coda del diavolo – Turin, 1885
 Don Chisciotte (after Miguel de Cervantes's Don Quixote) – Venice, 1887
 Il frutto proibito – Barcelona, 1888
 Roma intangibile

References

Italian opera composers
Male opera composers
1852 births
1906 deaths
Italian classical composers
Italian male classical composers
Musicians from Trieste
Italian people of Czech descent
19th-century Italian musicians
19th-century Italian male musicians